Virtuous Retail is an institutionally owned developer and operator of shopping centres. Established in 2007, Virtuous Retail is a joint venture between Singapore-based Xander Group and the Dutch institutional investor APG. Its India chapter is based out of Bangalore.

The company currently owns and manages six shopping centres in India: VR Bengaluru, VR Chennai, VR Punjab, VR Surat, VR Ambarsar and VR Nagpur. In September 2019, Virtuous Retail announced the acquisition of three more shopping centres, Bangalore (Mantri Arena), Delhi and Mumbai, at a combined cost of $500 million, including the purchase of a 20-acre land parcel in Thane from Raymond Group for $100 million in October 2019.

See also

 VR Chennai 
 VR Bengaluru
VR Ambarsar
VR Nagpur

References

External links
 Official website

Companies based in Bangalore
Real estate companies of India
Real estate companies established in 2007
Indian companies established in 2007
2007 establishments in Karnataka